LeBoeuf, Le Boeuf, LeBœuf or Le Bœuf  may refer to:

People
 David LeBoeuf (b. 1989), American politician
 Edmond Le Bœuf (1809–1888), French general, Marshal of France
 Frank Leboeuf (b. 1968), French footballer, actor, and sports commentator
 Henry Le Bœuf (1874–1935), Belgian banker, patron of the arts, and music lover
 Laurence Leboeuf (b. 1985), Canadian actress
 Michael LeBoeuf (b. ? ), American business author and management professor
 Remy Le Boeuf (b. 1986), American jazz saxophonist, composer, and multi-instrumentalist
 Shia LaBeouf (b. 1986), American actor, performance artist, and filmmaker

Other
 Fort Le Boeuf, a fort that was located near present-day Waterford, Pennsylvania
 Lake LeBoeuf, a lake in Pennsylvania, United States
 Le Boeuf Brothers,a modern jazz group
 LeBoeuf Township, Erie County, Pennsylvania
 LeBoeuf Creek (disambiguation)
 LeBoeuf, Lamb, Greene & MacRae, a law firm
 Le Bœuf sur le toit, a ballet
 Le Boeuf sur le Toit (cabaret), a cabaret in Paris

See also
 Boeuf or Bœuf (disambiguation)

Surnames of French origin